Arve Haugen (born 28 May 1943) is a Norwegian cyclist. He was born in Trondheim. He competed at the 1972 Summer Olympics in Munich, where he placed fifth in team trial with the Norwegian team, which consisted of Knut Knudsen, Thorleif Andresen, Magne Orre and Haugen.

References

External links
 

1943 births
Living people
Sportspeople from Trondheim
Norwegian male cyclists
Olympic cyclists of Norway
Cyclists at the 1972 Summer Olympics